The Monument Square Historic District encompasses a city park and its surrounding buildings at the top of Breed's Hill in the Charlestown neighborhood of Boston, Massachusetts.  The location is notable as the site of the 1775 Battle of Bunker Hill, early in the American Revolutionary War.  Monument Square was laid out in the 19th century, when the Bunker Hill Monument (a National Historic Landmark) was erected there.  The park is framed by predominantly residential buildings built in the mid-19th century.

The district was listed on the National Register of Historic Places in 1987.

See also
National Register of Historic Places listings in northern Boston, Massachusetts

References

1987 establishments in Massachusetts
Charlestown, Boston
Greek Revival architecture in Massachusetts
Historic districts in Suffolk County, Massachusetts
Historic districts on the National Register of Historic Places in Massachusetts
National Register of Historic Places in Boston
Victorian architecture in Massachusetts